Birkenhead ferry wharf is located on Iron Cove serving the Sydney suburb of Birkenhead Point. From November 1994 until October 2010, It was served by Sydney Ferries Parramatta River services operating from Circular Quay. 

Birkenhead Wharf is located adjacent to the Iron Cove Bridge and close to Birkenhead Point Outlet Centre.

Interchanges
A bus stop exists nearby on Victoria Road, about a two-minute walk away. Busways services run from the city to West Ryde and Parramatta.

References

External links

Birkenhead Wharf at Transport for NSW

Ferry wharves in Sydney